The 2010 California State Treasurer election was held on November 2, 2010, to choose the State Treasurer of California. The primary election was held on June 8, 2010. Democratic Incumbent Bill Lockyer won reelection.

Candidates 
The following were certified by the California Secretary of State as candidates in the primary election for State Treasurer. Candidates who won their respective primaries and qualified for the general election are shown in bold.

American Independent 
 Robert Lauten

Democratic 
 Bill Lockyer, incumbent State Treasurer

Green 
 Charles "Kit" Crittenden, retired professor

Libertarian 
 Edward Teyssier, business owner/attorney

Peace and Freedom 
 Debra L. Reiger, retired technology manager

Republican 
 Mimi Walters, state senator

Primary results

General results

References

External links

Official campaign Web sites 
Robert Lauten
Bill Lockyer
Mimi Walters

State Treasurer

California state treasurer elections
California